Danse de la chèvre (French for Dance of the Goat) is a piece for solo flute by Arthur Honegger, written in 1921 as incidental music for dancer Lysana of Sacha Derek's play La mauvaise pensée. At the start of the piece, there is a slow dreamlike introduction consisting of tritone phrases. This soon unwinds into the "goat-like" theme in a chromatically altered F major in 9/8 that skips along, providing the picture of a dancing goat. Following this theme is a more melodic theme or idea that gives off a more calming feeling. The goat theme and the calm theme both reoccur once again, and at the end of the piece the slow dreamlike idea returns and closes off the piece with a soft and quiet harmonic C for resolution. It is approximately three and a half minutes long. (The piece is approximately ABRSM grade eight standard and can also be found on the ABRSM flute diploma syllabus.)

The original manuscript of this piece has been lost. The editions that are out now were derived from a partial transcript found in Honegger's transcriptionist's works. The piece has been worked on by historians to be as accurate as possible.

Bibliography
Halbreich, Harry. Arthur Honegger

Compositions by Arthur Honegger
Solo flute pieces